Rawal Ranasimha also known as Rana Singh was the ruler of the Guhila dynasty in the 12th century. He succeeded his father Vikramsimha. He was succeeded by his son Kshemasimha. It is because of his name that all the rulers of the Sisodia kingdom used the name Rana in front of their name as their title. Hammir Singh, the descendant of his son Rahapa regained power in 1326 after they were removed from power in 1303 by Alauddin Khalji.

References

Bibliography 

 

12th century BC by country